Sri Meenakshi Government Arts College for Women, is a women's general degree college located in Madurai, Tamil Nadu. It was established in the year 1965. The college is affiliated with Madurai Kamaraj University. This college offers different courses in arts, commerce and science.

Departments

Science

Physics
Chemistry
Mathematics
Computer Science
Home Science
Botany
Zoology

Arts and Commerce

Tamil
English
History
Geography
Economics
Business Administration
Commerce

Accreditation
The college is  recognized by the University Grants Commission (UGC).

References

External links

Educational institutions established in 1965
1965 establishments in Madras State
Colleges affiliated to Madurai Kamaraj University
Colleges in Madurai
Universities and colleges in Madurai district
Universities and colleges in Madurai